Tappy may refer to:
Tappy.co (est. 2020), Digital gifting marketplace founded in Stockholm, Sweden
Duncan Tappy (born 1984), British racing driver
Eric Tappy (born 1931), Swiss operatic tenor
Tappy Phillips (born 1948), American news correspondent
Art Larsen (1925–2012), American tennis player nicknamed "Tappy"
Tappi Iwase, Japanese video game music composer